Liukuaicuo is a railway station on the Taiwan Railways Administration Pingtung line located in Pingtung City, Pingtung County, Taiwan.

History
The station was opened on 20 December 1913. In October 2021, the station was proposed to be the new southern terminus of Taiwan High Speed Rail extension from the existing Zuoying HSR station in Zuoying District, Kaohsiung.

See also
 List of railway stations in Taiwan

References

1913 establishments in Taiwan
Railway stations in Pingtung County
Railway stations opened in 1913
Railway stations served by Taiwan Railways Administration